Šumperk is a town in the Olomouc Region of the Czech Republic. It has about 25,000 inhabitants. It is an industrial town, but it also contains valuable historical and architectural monuments. The historic town centre is well preserved and is protected by law as an urban monument zone.

Administrative parts
Šumperk is made up of one administrative part.

Etymology
The original German name is derived from Schön Berg, meaning "beautiful hill", which later supplemented by a distinguishing adjective Mährisch (i.e. Moravian). The Czech name Šumperk evolved from a direct phonetic transcription.

After World War II and the expulsion of Germans, there was a suggestion of giving the town a name with Czech origins. Suggestions included approximate translations such as Krásná Hora, Krásov or Krásno nad Děsnou, and names unrelated to the original name, such as Svobodov, Velenov, Lnářov and Přadlenov. In the end the name of Šumperk remained unchanged.

Geography
It lies entirely in the Hanušovice Highlands, but for its proximity to the Hrubý Jeseník mountains, the town is sometimes nicknamed "The Gate to Jeseník."

Šumperk is located on the Bratrušovský Creek. It is a tributary of the Desná River, which forms the southern municipal border.

History

13th–16th centuries
Šumperk was probably established by German settlers from Silesia in the second half of the 13th century. The town rapidly became prosperous due to rich deposits of precious metals. Šumperk belonged to the Margrave of Moravia. The first written mention of Šumperk is from 1281. This document refers to Jeneč of Šumperk, a town administrator who lived in a small fort on the outskirts. The fort has not been preserved. A Dominican monastery was founded in 1297.

Šumperk was sold to lords of Lipá by Margrave Charles in 1340. Šumperk was regained by the Margrave of Moravia in 1352. In 1391, Jobst of Moravia granted Magdeburg rights for Šumperk including "The Mile Right", guaranteeing a production and trade monopoly for the inhabitants of the town up to a distance of 1 German mile from town gates. Šumperk inhabitants were also granted permission for brewing.

During the Hussite Wars, the town was pawned to Catholic nobleman Beneš of Valdštejn, therefore Šumperk was opposed to the Hussite Reformation. The Hussite armies successfully completed their campaign in East Bohemia on 14 September 1424, and moved into North Moravia on 23 September. Šumperk was not the principal target of the Hussite warlords, whose primary goal was to conquer the Moravian Margraviate capital in Olomouc, but an attack on Šumperk was initiated by local lord Proček Bouzovský of Vildenberk, the owner of Loštice. The siege was short because the town gates were opened by Hussite sympathizers in Šumperk. Proček Bouzovský of Vildenberk ruled the town until 1445, when Šumperk was besieged by Catholics from Olomouc. Again, town gates were opened by disloyal inhabitants.

In 1490, Šumperk was the location of a meeting of Bohemian and Moravian provincial diet members, at which they came to an agreement about Vladislaus II's candidature for Czech throne. In 1496, Šumperk was bought by the House of Zierotin.

16th–17th centuries

The Zierotins became permanent owners of Šumperk in 1507. Petr of Zierotin chose Šumperk Castle as his family seat and has built the town walls. In the relatively peaceful 16th century, the town became prosperous, mainly due to the textile craft. The prosperity enabled the town to buy itself out of serfdom, and it became directly subordinate to the Bohemian king in 1562. During the second half of the 16th century, the town was hit by three plague epidemics and devastating floods.

In 1622, Šumperk lost its privileges for participating in the Bohemian Revolt and was acquired by the House of Lichtenstein, who owned the town until the fall of the feudal system in 1848. At the end Thirty Years' War, between 1642 and 1646, the town was conquered and looted several times by Swedish army. In 1669, Šumperk was hit by a large fire, which destroyed the entire town. By the end of the 17th century, the town was rebuilt in ruins.

Between 1679 and 1693, 25 people from Šumperk were killed in witch trials.

18th–19th centuries

Vienna industrialist Johann Ernst Klapperoth established a factory producing corduroy in 1785, the first of its kind in the Habsburg monarchy. The number of factories in the town rose gradually through the 19th century, when large linen and textile factories were established. A flax spinning mill was opened in 1842. During the 19th century, Šumperk became the Moravian centre for the industrial production of linen and silk.

Other local businesses included a brewery (opened 1861), a foundry (opened 1868), a factory producing earthenware (opened 1868), a mineral oil refinery (opened 1871), a textile machine factory (opened 1898), a factory producing iron goods (opened 1903), three large sawmills (in 1905), three brickworks (in 1905), two factories producing flying shuttles and bobbins (in 1905). Other businesses operating in the early 20th century were two leather factories, a factory processing fats, a cardboard factory, a slaughterhouse, a power plant and gasworks.

In 1871, a railway line between Šumperk and Zábřeh was completed.

In the second half of the 19th century, due to the development of industry and economic prosperity, the urban and architectural face of the town changed significantly, and important Viennese architects were invited to build villas and other buildings. For its approach to the appearance of Vienna, Šumperk was sometimes nicknamed "Little Vienna".

20th century

Sudeten Germans on the Austria-Hungary Imperial Council declared sovereignty for German-inhabited Moravia, including Šumperk, under the name Sudetenland of the Republic of German-Austria. Czechs did not accept the division and, following the idea of the Bohemian state rights, declared that all of Bohemia and Moravia be included the establishing Czechoslovak state. 

One of the German rebels was the mayor of Šumperk, Gustav Oberleithner, who became vice-prime minister. On 7 November, Czech envoys demanded surrender of Šumperk's German self-government. Establishing facts on the grounds, Czechoslovak troops invaded the German-speaking areas. On 15 December 1918, Šumperk surrendered at the thread of shots to be fired to the town. The town council published an official order that people should not show any resistance. Gustav Oberleithner was not punished, as the international status of Czechoslovakia was complicated and Czechoslovak sovereignty over Šumperk was not clear from an international law perspective. On 4 March 1919, the Czechs denied participation of representatives from Sudetenland to Austria's parliament.  

The Czech population, previously small, grew substantially during the interwar period, causing ethnic tension. In 1910, 353 Czechs lived in the town, but by 1930, this number had increased to over 2,000, concentrated in the "Czech quarter". Konrad Henlein's Nazi Sudeten German Party, openly supportive of Adolf Hitler, received 64% of the votes in the elections of 1935.

After the Munich agreement, Šumperk was occupied by the Wehrmacht, and was attached to the Third Reich as part of Sudetenland province. The last Czech families moved inland. The occupation and the World War II halted the economic prosperity and brought great casualties.

After the World War II, the German inhabitants of the town were expelled, with more than 9,500 people being moved in 11 convoys. Šumperk was rapidly repopulated, especially by Czechs from inland.

Although the Communist Party won the Šumperk election in 1946 with 34.7% of the vote, the council was ruled by a coalition of social democrats. After the coup d'état in 1948, all businesses, without exception, were confiscated by the state and united into large entities. During the 1960s, extensive concrete residential tower blocks were erected on the outskirts of the town.

On 21 August 1968, Šumperk was occupied by the Polish People's Army, which was replaced by the Red Army on 3 October 1968. Jan Zajíc, a student of the Šumperk Industrial School, committed suicide by self-immolation as a political protest against Soviet occupation, following Jan Palach. The Soviet army left Šumperk in May 1990 after the Velvet Revolution.

Demographics

Economy

Šumperk was a significant centre of the textile industry throughout the Austria-Hungary, interwar and Communist eras. Thanks to factories focusing on the production of natural and synthetic silk, Šumperk has become a European centre of silk industry. Communist rule nationalised every company in Šumperk and united them into a large national company named Hedva. The silk production in Hedva ended in 1998 and only thread production continued. However, in 2019, this production ended as well and that meant the end of textile industry tradition in the town.

Today, Šumperk is still an industrial town, even though the focus has changed. The largest industrial employer is TDK Electronics, which produces ferrites for automotive purposes. The beginnings of production in Šumperk date back to 1956, when the ferrites were produced under Pramet brand. The second largest industrial company is Dormer Pramet, a manufacturer and supplier of cutting tools. It is a successor of the Pramet company, which was founded here in 1951.

A significant company is also Škoda Pars which renovates old trains and trams; its best known product is the RegioNova train.

The largest non-industrial employer is the Šumperk hospital.

Transport
Šumperk is located on the Brno–Olomouc–Šumperk railway line.

Culture

Cultural institutions located in Šumperk include a cinema, the North Moravian Theatre, or a regional museum. The main cultural facilities are the Šumperk Cultural Hall and the town's library.

Several festivals take place annually in the town:
Blues Alive is the biggest international blues festival in Central Europe. It was established in 1996.
Slavnosti města Šumperka ("Festival of the town of Šumperk") is a festival with a historical theme, a tradition since 1998.
Město čte knihu ("The town reads a book") is a literary and film festival, which has been held annually since 2005. The purpose of the festival is to read a selected book by a selected author.
Klášterní hudební slavnosti ("Monastery music festivities") is a series of classical music concerts during the summer. The festival was established in 2007.
Divadlo v parku ("Theatre in park") is a theatre festival. The festival, organized by the local theatre, hosts professional ensembles from other towns and cities.
International Folklore Festival is a parade of folk ensembles from all over the world that takes place every year in several places in the town.

Sport
The town's ice hockey club Draci Šumperk plays in the 1st Czech Republic Hockey League (second tier of the Czech ice hockey system).

FK Šumperk is the town's football club, playing in the fourth tier of the Czech football system.

Sights

In the second half of the 19th century and first half of the 20th century, many architectural gems were created in the town, first especially in the Neoclassical and Neorenaissance styles, later in the Functionalist style. Notable is the town hall which is a landmark of the town centre. It was built in the Saxon Neo-Renaissance style in 1909–1911, and replaced an old Gothic town hall first mentioned in 1475.

Pavlínin dvůr is a former manor house, rebuilt into a Neorenaissance residence in 1876. Today the building serves as the regional museum. It is located in a large town park Sady 1. května, which was created from the ornamental garden of the residence. Other significant buildings are the library that was built in 1893–1894 and rebuilt in 1928, Neoclassical former German grammar school from 1897, or the Neo-romantic theatre building from 1901 to 1902.

Valuable functionalistic buildings include Hotel Grand built in 1931–1932 and Ottokar Katzer's house from 1930.

The former Church of the Annunciation is a remnant of Dominican monastery, which was abolished in 1784. After the fire in 1784 it was rebuilt in the Baroque style. Today this valuable historic monument serves cultural and social purposes. The monastery building serves as the seat of a secondary medical school.

Geschader's House, today known as House of the European Meeting, is one of the oldest houses in Šumperk. In its Gothic cellar is permanent exhibition on witch trials.

Other sights in Šumperk include Church of Saint John the Baptist, Church of Saint Barbara, and fragments of the town walls.

Notable people

Leo Slezak (1873–1946), tenor singer
Gertrude Pitzinger (1904–1997), German opera singer
Roman Karl Scholz (1912–1944), Austrian writer and resistance fighter
Radoslav Nenadál (1929–2018), writer and translator
Gerda Frömel (1931–1975), Irish-German sculptor
Hans Klein (1931–1996), German politician
Eugen Brixel (1939–2000), Austrian composer and musician
Miroslav Krobot (born 1951), actor and theatre director
Miroslav Tulis (born 1951), athlete
Jan Balabán (1961–2010), writer, journalist and translator
Ivana Kubešová (born 1962), middle-distance runner
Jaroslav Mostecký (born 1963), author
Jiří Dopita (born 1968), ice hockey player
Jaroslav Miller (born 1971), professor of history and rector
Ondřej Sokol (born 1971), director, actor and translator
Simona Babčáková (born 1973), actress
Aleš Valenta (born 1973), freestyle skier, Olympic winner
Alena Kupčíková (born 1976), contemporary artist
Radoslav Kováč (born 1979), football player and manager
Ivana Večeřová (born 1979), basketball player
Jan Hudec (born 1981), Czech-Canadian skier
Jakub Kindl (born 1987), ice hockey player

Twin towns – sister cities

Šumperk is twinned with:

 Bad Hersfeld, Germany
 Ebreichsdorf, Austria
 Maarssen, Netherlands
 Mikulov, Czech Republic
 Nysa, Poland
 Prievidza, Slovakia
 Sulmona, Italy
 Vaasa, Finland

Gallery

References

External links

 
Information Centre of Šumperk
Culture, news and information from the region Šumperk 

Populated places in Šumperk District
Cities and towns in the Czech Republic
Shtetls
Populated places established in the 13th century